The QS mark (from Qiye Shipin shengchan xuke, meaning authorised manufacturing for enterprises, formally the Industrial Product Manufacturing License) is a Chinese quality and safety mark for food, beverages and other products. Introduced in 2003, it is managed by the General Administration of Quality Supervision, Inspection and Quarantine (GAQSIQ). The license is required for many product categories if they are both manufactured and sold in China. The mark was‘as deprecated in October 2018, and replaced with the SC system, which consists of the letters SC followed by a 14 digit number. SC means Sheng Chan (manufacturing) and the number is partially unique to each food processing facility. The first three digits represent the food category, the next two digits represent the province, the 6th and 7th digits represent the city, the 8th and 9th the district, the 10th to 13th are the sequence code for the production license, which is unique and has to be renewed every 5 years, and the last digit is  the evaluation code. An example code is SC10532011500380, which means: 105: milk, 32: Jiangsu, 01: Nanjing, 15: Jiangning district, 0038: license number, and 0: evaluation code, Meaning that the product was made in the Jiangning district of Nanjing, Jiangsu province.

References

See also 
 Food safety in China
 State Administration for Market Regulation

Food safety in China
Certification marks